Bangor University Football Club are a Welsh football club based in Bangor, Gwynedd. They compete in the British Universities and Colleges Sport (BUCS) competition in the Northern 3A League.

They have also previously competed  in the Gwynedd League.

In the BUCS competitions they have numerous teams - and currently fields a first, second, third & Women's team in this competition. The first team compete in the BUCS Mars Northern 3A League after winning the 4A league in the 2012–13 season. The second & third team both compete in the BUCS Mars Northern 6C League. The Women's team now compete in the BUCS Mars Women's 3A league after winning the 3B league in the 2012–2013 season.

The club is the largest in the University's Athletic Union.

The club's crest and colours are those of the university

Honours

 North Gwynedd & YNS Non Sunday League Division One Winner: 2008–09
BUCS Mars Northern 4C League Winner – 2012–13
BUCS Women's Mars 3B League Winner 2012–13
Eryi Shield Winner – 2003–04
Eryi Shield Runner Up – 1991–92, 2005–06, 2009–10
Cwpan Gwynedd Runner up – 2003–04, 2012–13

External links
BUCS team profile

References 

Football clubs in Wales
Mid Wales Football League clubs
Football
Sport in Bangor, Gwynedd
University and college football clubs in Wales
Gwynedd League clubs
Welsh Alliance League clubs